Microsoft Safety Scanner is a free  virus scanner similar to Windows Malicious Software Removal Tool that can be used to scan a system for computer viruses and other forms of malware. It was released on 15 April 2011, following the discontinuation of Windows Live OneCare Safety Scanner.

It is not meant to be used as a day-to-day tool, as it does not provide real-time protection against viruses, cannot update its virus definitions and expires after ten days. However, it can be run on a computer that already has an antivirus product without any potential interference, and can therefore be used to scan a potentially infected computer as a second check from another antivirus program. It uses the same detection engine and malware definitions as Microsoft Security Essentials and Microsoft Forefront Endpoint Protection.

License restriction
, part of Microsoft Safety Scanner's end-user license agreement which restricts its use reads:

Notes

References

Further reading

External links
 

2011 software
Windows-only freeware